The  Vancouver Academy of Music (VAM) is a Canadian music conservatory located in Vancouver, British Columbia. The school was founded as the Community Music School of Greater Vancouver in 1969 through efforts made by the Vancouver Community Arts Council. The school was originally located on West 12th Ave but relocated to the Music Centre in Vanier Park in May 1976. The school officially changed its name to the Vancouver Academy of Music in 1979. The VAM currently has two divisions of study, a college division for students wanting to pursue a performance career and a preparatory division for school-age children and adults.

History
When the VAM was initially founded, it only offered classes for young children in the Orff, Suzuki, and Kodály methods. In 1971 trumpeter Jerold Gerbrecht (longtime principal trumpet of the Vancouver Symphony Orchestra) was brought in as music director to expand the school to include adult classes in music theory, history, composition, dance, and private instrumental and voice instruction. The school also formed an orchestra and a choir, but at this time still did not grant degrees.

The Academy's program offerings continued to expand throughout the 1970s and 1980s with master classes, opera workshops, and other specialized courses. This success led the school to establish a collegiate program, the S. K. Lee College Program, in 1987 in partnership with Thompson Rivers University and the British Columbia Open University (BCOU). Students attend non-music classes at TRU and have their music courses at the Academy. Bachelor of Music degrees are awarded through the BCOU.

Orchestras

The Academy has Junior, Intermediate, and Senior Symphony Orchestras. Three times a year, the Senior Academy Strings joins forces with the wind department to form the Academy Symphony Orchestra to perform at the Vancouver Orpheum Theatre. Notable conductors include the late Sidney Harth.

Notable faculty (past and present)
Robert Creech, French horn
Kum-Sing Lee, Piano
Phyllis Mailing, Voice
David Meek, Voice
Steven Staryk, Violin
Gwen Thompson, Violin

Notable alumni
Lisle Ellis, composer
Chan-hon Goh, ballet dancer
Erin Wall, operatic soprano
Jon Kimura Parker, pianist

See also
:Category:Academic staff of the Vancouver Academy of Music

References

External links
Vancouver Academy of Music

Classical music in Canada
Performing arts in Vancouver
Music schools in Canada
Education in Vancouver
Educational institutions established in 1969
1969 establishments in British Columbia